Axel Alan Rodríguez (born 25 March 1997) is an Argentine professional footballer who plays as a forward for Patronato, on loan from Olimpo.

Career
Rodríguez, who had a youth spell with Libertad de Bahía Blanca, was promoted into the senior squad of Olimpo in 2015, making appearances against Arsenal de Sarandí and Godoy Cruz as the club placed eighteenth. He didn't feature for the first-team for another three seasons, with Mario Sciacqua recalling him up for a 2017–18 fixture with Gimnasia y Esgrima. He made five total appearances that campaign, two of which were starts as they were relegated. Rodríguez subsequently scored five times in his opening ten matches in Primera B Nacional, netting four of the five in consecutive home matches; equalling a 2008 record set by Josemir Lujambio.

After a loan spell at All Boys in 2021, Rodríguez joined Patronato at the end of January 2022 on a loan deal until the end of the year with a purchase option.

Career statistics
.

References

External links

1997 births
Living people
Sportspeople from Bahía Blanca
Argentine footballers
Association football forwards
Argentine Primera División players
Primera Nacional players
Olimpo footballers
All Boys footballers
Club Atlético Patronato footballers